Claudia Mason (born March 9, 1973) is an American model and actress.

Mason has been featured on the covers of many fashion magazines including Vogue, Elle, W and Cosmopolitan. Mason has appeared in fashion campaigns for the likes of Louis Vuitton, Fendi, and Versace. She hosted MTV’s fashion special Fashionably Loud and starred in the Enrique Iglesias music video “Rhythm Divine.” She starred in the feature film Outpatient (2002) which was picked up for distribution by Magnolia Pictures following its reception at the Toronto Film Festival.  She was also featured in the Woody Allen film Celebrity (1998). Mason completed a run of Tennessee Williams’ Orpheus Descending in LA (2010), which she produced as well as starred in as Carol Cutrere, alongside actors Gale Harold and Denise Crosby. The production was nominated for a McCulloh Award for best revival of a play by the Los Angeles Drama Critics Circle, and Mason also received Outstanding Performance by a Featured Actress.

Early life 

Mason was born and raised in New York City. She began studying ballet at the age of five, training at the School of American Ballet. An Elite Model Management scout first discovered Mason in a record store at the age of 13. Her career took off, landing her in campaigns for Revlon, Versace, and Sportmax to name a few. She attended Fiorello H. LaGuardia High School of Music & Art and Performing Arts and then transferred to the Professional Children's School because her career took up so much of her time. She is Jewish, as is her mother. Mason's father is African-American.

Career 

Claudia Mason’s first professional booking was for Vogue. Within her first few months of modeling, she had worked with great photographers like Mario Testino, Steven Meisel, Richard Avedon, Bruce Weber, and Patrick Demarchelier. In the early nineties, Mason  was featured in Vogue, Mademoiselle, and Elle. Mason has worked for designers such as Yves Saint Laurent, Karl Lagerfield, Valentino, Armani, Versace, Christian Lacroix, Oscar de la Renta, Marc Jacobs, and Calvin Klein.
Mason then landed roles in independent films Schmoozer, Discovering Daisy, LAX (2002), and Lime Salted Love (2006). She starred opposite Jason Kirk in Outpatient, an independent film. She also starred in the world premiere of Two Ships Passing at the Pan Andreas Theatre (2004), for which she was named Outstanding Female Actor in a Lead Role. Mason’s television appearances include guest roles on Kitchen Confidential, CSI:NY, How I Met Your Mother and October Road. She also appeared as a special guest on America’s Next Top Model (2007). Mason appeared in Ramma Moseley’s short film Grace (2009) and the film The Brass Teapot. She appears in UK indie, Spite & Malice: Rules to Filmmaking, as Charlotte Russell. In November 2013 Mason completed an off Broadway run of an original play called The Goddess directed by Alice Jankell.

Personal life 

Mason is an advocate for women’s health and has written about oocyte cryopreservation (egg freezing).

Filmography

Films

Television

Theater

Music Videos

References

External links 

American female models
American film actresses
American television actresses
American stage actresses
Living people
Models from New York City
1973 births
21st-century American women